Porela subfasciata, the fasciated porela, is a species of moth of the family Lasiocampidae. It was first described by (Francis Walker in 1855 and is known from the Australian states of Tasmania and Victoria.

The wingspan is about 30 mm for males and about 40 mm for females. Adults are brown with wiggly white bands across each wing. The forewings each have a prominent white spot near the middle, and an irregular submarginal line of black spots.

References

External links
CSIRO Ecosystem Sciences - Australian Moths Online

Lasiocampidae
Moths of Australia
Moths described in 1855